Cutlet and Vegetables is an 1816 oil painting by American still life artist Raphaelle Peale.

References

1816 paintings
Paintings in the collection of the Timken Museum of Art